The men's 5000 metres at the 2002 European Athletics Championships were held at the Olympic Stadium on August 11.

Results

External links
Results

5000
5000 metres at the European Athletics Championships